Lyudmila Butuzova (born 28 February 1957) is a high jumper from the Soviet Union, who set the Kazakhstani and Uzbekistani national record on 1984-06-10, jumping 1.98 metres in Sochi.

References
 Statistics
 Profile

1957 births
Living people
Soviet female high jumpers
Russian female high jumpers
Kazakhstani female high jumpers
Uzbekistani female high jumpers
Friendship Games medalists in athletics